Tikmeh Tappeh (also Romanized as Tīkmeh Tappeh; also known as Tokmeh Tappeh) is a village in Charuymaq-e Markazi Rural District, in the Central District of Charuymaq County, East Azerbaijan Province, Iran. At the 2006 census, its population was 83, in 12 families.

References 

Populated places in Charuymaq County